Marieholm may refer to:

Marieholm, Eslöv, locality in Eslöv Municipality, Sweden
Marieholm, Gnosjö, locality in Gnosjö Municipality, Sweden
Marieholms Bruk, shipyard in Småland, Sweden